Day Out of Days is a 2015 American drama film directed by Zoe Cassavetes and co-written by Cassavetes and Alexia Landeau, who also starred in the film. In addition to Landeau the film also starred Bellamy Young, Eddie Izzard and Alessandro Nivola. It premiered at the 2015 Los Angeles Film Festival to mixed reviews.

Plot
Mia Roarke, an actress, is on a personal and professional high after appearing in a successful period piece Wild Sunset and getting engaged to her co-star, Liam.

10 years later, Mia is divorced from Liam and is struggling to book roles. Her agent gets her an audition with director Dag, who auditions her in a hotel room where he encourages her to take coke and forces her into the bathroom to take a shower. Leaving the hotel she runs into Liam who drives her home. She congratulates him on his  engagement to a model, Elle, though in return he tells her that their engagement is by no means assured.

Mia's neighbour Charlotte "Charlie" Riley books a pilot and helps to arrange an audition for Mia who learns that the role is to play Charlie's character's mother.

Her friend, Jen, sets her up with a recovering alcoholic who does pools and ends up insulting during the course of their date, telling her she's not as attractive as she once was.

Mia's auditions for Charlie's pilot goes well and she begins to think that she has the role. After a day being gifted free clothing and accessories under the assumption that she has the role her agent calls her with the news that ultimately she didn't get it.

On reshoots for a zombie thriller movie Mia fights with her director, Tark, on how to shoot a car crash scene. When she tells him she doesn't understand the point of yelling during a scene he humiliates her by insulting her career and her love life. A dejected Mia gives in and does the scene his way.

Mia goes to meet her agent who hints that after 20 years of working together their relationship might be coming to a close. She afterwards has dinner with her mother and former manager who still keeps pictures of Mia and Liam around her apartment.

After a day of drinking she calls Liam who answers her call and meets her at a bar. Though Liam is initially warm towards Mia, she mistakes his gestures as an overture and ends up trying to kiss him. The encounter is filmed and broadcast on the internet. Mia's agent tells her that the notoriety is good for her, but Mia is humiliated and decides to make a change. She contemplates selling her house and decides to cut off her mother.

Just as she is in the middle of calling it quits her agent contacts her and tells her that her horror movie with Tark is testing well and the studio wants to sign her and all the other actors for sequels.

Mia is offered directorial approval on the sequels to the zombie movies and has dinner with Tark and his agent who both grovel to her.

She goes to a pawn shop to retrieve some jewelry she pawned when she was short on cash. She decides not to retrieve her engagement ring from Liam. Exiting the pawn shop she bumps into a man she doesn't remember who informs her that he was her driver on the set of her movie with Tark.

Cast
 Alexia Landeau as Mia Roarke
 Christa B. Allen as Charlie
 Melanie Griffith as Kathy
 Eddie Izzard as Dag
 Brooke Smith as Annabel
 Guy Burnet as E.J.
 Vincent Kartheiser as Tark
 Alessandro Nivola as Liam
 Cheyenne Jackson as Phil
 Bellamy Young as Rebecca

Production
Cassavetes turned to crowdfunding to finance the movie as she was unable to secure funding with Landeau in the lead.

Critical response
The film received mixed reviews after its premiere. The Hollywood Reporter found it to be "a closely observed but familiar portrait of a fallen star." The Playlist's critic gave it a B+ score and called it "a searing indictment of Hollywood's treatment of women."

References

External links
 
 

2015 films
2015 drama films
American drama films
American independent films
Crowdfunded films
2015 independent films
2010s English-language films
2010s American films